Akola  is a municipal corporation and the third largest city in Vidarbha after Nagpur and Amravati and tenth largest city in Maharashtra. is located about  east of the state capital, Mumbai, and  west of the second capital, Nagpur. Akola is the administrative headquarters of the Akola district located in the Amravati division, and is governed by the Akola Municipal Corporation.

Akola is located north-central of Maharashtra state, western India, on the banks of the Morna River. Although it is not considered a common tourist destination, Akola is an important city due to its history, culture, politics, and agriculture. It also has a prominent road and rail junction in the Tapti River valley that functions as a commercial trading center.

Akola is an important educational center with several colleges affiliated with the Sant Gadge Baba Amravati University. The city is developing into a market center. The primary language spoken by the people of Akola is Marathi.

History

Early medieval history (Classical) 
Akola is mentioned to be a part of Berar province and the legendary kingdom of Vidarbha in the Sanskrit epic Mahabharata. Berar also formed part of the Mauryan Empire during the reign of Ashoka (272 to 231 BCE), before being ruled by the Satavahana dynasty (2nd century BCE – 2nd century CE), the Vakataka dynasty (3rd to 6th centuries), the Chalukya dynasty (6th to 8th centuries), the Rashtrakuta dynasty (8th to 10th centuries), the Chalukya dynasty (10th to 12th centuries), and the Yadava dynasty of Devagiri (late 12th to early 14th centuries-old

 Hazrat Masoom Armaan Shah Baba Dargah, Balapur, Akola

Late medieval history 
A period of Muslim rule began when Alauddin Khalji, Sultan of Delhi, conquered the region in the early 14th century. The region was part of the Bahmani Sultanate, which broke away from the Delhi Sultanate in the middle of the 14th century. The Bahmani Sultanate itself broke up into smaller sultanates at the end of the 15th century, and in 1572 Berar became part of the Nizam Shahi sultanate, based at Ahmednagar. The Nizam Shahis ceded Berar to the Mughal Empire in 1595, and the Mughals ruled the Berar province during the 17th century. The Akola fort was heavily fortified during the Mughal king Aurangzeb's rule. As Mughal rule started to unravel at the start of the 18th century, Asif Jah I, Nizam of Hyderabad seized the southern provinces of the empire (including Berar) in 1724 to form an independent state.

Maratha Empire 
The region came under the rule of Chhatrapati Shivaji Maharaj, and later his sons as the Maratha Empire rose from 1674 to 1760. When Chatrapati Shahu Maharaj I died in 1749, he appointed Peshwa as the head of the Maratha Empire with certain conditions. The third battle of Panipat in 1761 crippled the Maratha Empire and weakened the power of Peshwa, but Berar remained under Maratha rule.

The Battle of Argaon in 1803 was fought in Akola between the British and the Marathas during the Second Anglo-Maratha War. In the third Anglo-Maratha War, the last Peshwa, Baji Rao II, was defeated. In 1853, the Akola district together with the rest of Berar came under the administration of the British East India Company. Berar was divided into East and West Berar with the Akola district being included in the west. In 1903, Berar was leased to the Nizam of Hyderabad by the British East India Company in return for the debt.

Post-independence 
After India's independence in 1947 from the British Government, the newly formed country was divided into different states. The Congress's proposed linguistic provinces plan before the Independence of India had positioned Akola as the headquarters of the Berar region.

The states and provinces of India were reorganized in 1956, and the region of Berar was divided among different states. Akola became a part of bilingual state of Bombay which was further divided into two states in 1960 when Akola became a part of the new state of Maharashtra.

Demographics

After the city's municipal limits were extended in Aug 2016, it was recorded to have a population of 537,137.

Geography and climate

Governance

Police administration 

Akola Police maintains eight police stations in the Akola city subdivision that cover the metropolitan area of the city.

The government also approved the creation of a new Railway Police Akola subdivision that will include Akola, Wardha, and Badnera railway police units. The Akola Police subdivision falls under the Nagpur District of Railway.

Transportation

Air

It was built by British authorities in the 1940s and regularly sent flights to Mumbai. Now it is non-functional and has one runway (4,600×145 ft). The airport's expansion and use have been delayed as it is unable to get land from the university of Dr. Panjabrao Deshmukh Krishi Vidyapeeth.

Road

NH-6, which connects Surat to Kolkata, passes through the city. State Highways No. 68 and 69 also pass through the municipal limits. Other highways include State Highway 204, State Highway 200: Akola – Amravati, and State Highway 197. NH-161 begins from Akola and reaches in Telangana near Hyderabad.

Rail
The city is served by the Akola Junction railway station.

Education

Agricultural university
Akola houses Dr. Panjabrao Deshmukh Krishi Vidyapeeth (PDKV), whose jurisdiction covers all eleven districts of Vidarbha.

Medical science colleges
 Government Medical College, Akola

Notable people 
 Vasantrao Deshpande
 Anand Modak
 Vijay P. Bhatkar
 Patrick Barr
 Vitthal Wagh
 Sudharak Olwe
 Shivdeep Lande
Ranjit Patil
Sanjay Shamrao Dhotre
T. S. Korde
Vallabhdas Aidan Mohta

See also
 Akola railway station
 Akola Airport
 Vidarbha
 Dr. Panjabrao Deshmukh Krishi Vidyapeeth
 Varhadi language
 List of cities in Maharashtra

References

External links

 
 Bharat Krushak Samaj
 Akola Regional Transport Office

 
Akola district
Talukas in Maharashtra
Cities in Maharashtra